Autochloris almon is a moth of the subfamily Arctiinae. It was described by Pieter Cramer in 1779. It is found in Suriname and Brazil.

References

Arctiinae
Moths described in 1779
Moths of South America